Patrice Lawrence MBE (born 1960s) is a British writer and journalist, who has published fiction both for adults and children. Her writing has won awards including the Waterstones Children's Book Prize for Older Children and The Bookseller YA Book Prize. In 2021, she won the Jhalak Prize's inaugural children's and young adult category for her book Eight Pieces of Silva (2020).

Biography
Patrice Lawrence was born in Brighton, Sussex, England, and was brought up in an Italian-Trinidadian family, her mother having come to England from Trinidad to train as a psychiatric nurse. Lawrence has an MA in Writing for Film and TV, and was mentored by the BBC as a prospective comedy writer. Her first story to be published was "Duck, Duck, Goose", which was included in The Decibel Penguin Prize Anthology (Penguin Books, 2006). It was while attending an Arvon Foundation crime writing course led by Dreda Say Mitchell and Frances Fyfield that Lawrence had the idea for her debut young adults' novel, Orangeboy.

Published in 2016, Orangeboy won The Booksellers YA Book Prize 2017, the Waterstones Children's Book Prize for Older Children 2017, and was shortlisted for the 2016 Costa Children's Book Award. It received a five-star rating from MuggleNet, with the reviewer stating: "I absolutely adored this moving story. It is full of tears and laughter, unfettered fears and furious joy, family and friendship. This important, gripping, heart-in-your-throat contemporary about a teen boy swept up in trouble is not to be missed. For fans of Malorie Blackman, Jacqueline Wilson, Alan Gibbons, Benjamin Zephaniah, and Melvin Burgess. If you like your stories real, heartfelt, and moving, Orangeboy is one for you." Lawrence herself has been reported as saying of the novel that "though her primary aim had been to promote hope in her story of a teenager caught in gang violence, she wanted to reflect the real situation faced by many black teenagers in Britain".

Her follow-up book, Indigo Donut (2017), was described by Alex O'Connell in The Times as "addictive", having "many of the themes of a Jacqueline Wilson novel: bullying, fostering, teenage relationships. Yet Lawrence’s tale is told with unfettered dialogue and broad-ranging cultural references for an older audience who don’t need to be spared the details." The Guardian reviewer wrote: "Her award-winning debut Orangeboy, a gripping urban thriller, announced Patrice Lawrence as a bold, fresh voice in young adult fiction. This promise is realised in her second book, a tender and complex story of first love, family and belonging." Both novels are set in Hackney, London, where Lawrence has lived in Lower Clapton since 1997.

Lawrence also writes a regular blog centering on her experiences of writing and having her work published, called The Lawrence Line, about which she has said: "There are a lot of people coming up behind you and you want to let them know how it happens, particularly for young black writers. I want to show that I've had a good experience of publishing and give people hope that they can tell their stories."

Lawrence is a contributor to the 2019 anthology New Daughters of Africa, edited by Margaret Busby.

In October 2021, Lawrence was announced as taking on the role of ambassador for First Story, a charity promoting creative writing for young people, with a focus on those in low-income communities.

Selected bibliography
 Granny Ting Ting – for children (A & C Black, 2009, 80 pp.)
 Orangeboy (Hodder Children's Books, 2016, . Also available as an audiobook, narrated by Ben Bailey Smith.
 Indigo Donut (Hodder Children's Books, 2017)
 Eight Pieces of Silva (Hodder Children's Books, 2020)
 Rat (Oxford University Press, 2021)

References

External links
 "The Lawrence Line": "A blog about writing, selling writing and the family stories that inspire writing".
 "A Book That Changed my Life | Patrice Lawrence", Precious, 6 June 2017.
 "Patrice Lawrence Q&A:'I get to write a black girl into Enid Blyton's Malory Towers'", New Statesman, 20 February 2019.

 Jacob Hope, "An Interview with Patrice Lawrence", CILIP, 2 August 2020.

Living people
21st-century British women writers
English children's writers
English people of Trinidad and Tobago descent
21st-century English novelists
British women short story writers
People from Brighton
British women novelists
Year of birth missing (living people)
Black British women writers
Members of the Order of the British Empire